Charlotte Louisa Laurie (1856 – 25 March 1933) was a British botanist and educator known for her writing and teaching.

Laurie was born in 1856 in the British West Indies, the daughter of a clergyman in Barbados. She was educated at the Clergy Daughters' School in Bristol, and after some time in Barbados, the Maria Grey Training College. In 1880, she joined the staff of the Cheltenham Ladies College, where she wrote her first textbook on botany. It went on to be widely used in secondary schools.

Laurie was a "beloved" figure in the community. She was so widely respected as an educator that it was said that "a student coached by her could not fail."
 
In addition to her role as an educator, Laurie held a number of positions. She was at one time Honorary secretary of the Association of Assistant Mistresses (and later its president), of the Cheltenham Natural Science Society, of the Christian Social Union, and of the College Missionary Society Leaflet.

According to The Cheltenham Chronicle,

She is known to have written at least three botany textbooks published between 1903 and 1906. Her botanical studies focused on plants in Gloucestershire.

Her funeral at All Saints' Church, Cheltenham, where she was a member for many years, was widely attended and reported. The choir from the Ladies College sang. Family members listed as attending her funeral were Mr. Farrar Laurie (nephew) and Miss Laurie (niece); Miss Peacock, the Misses Andrews and Mrs. Conyers.

Bibliography

References 

1856 births
Date of birth missing
1933 deaths
People from Port of Spain
British botanists
British women scientists
Women botanists
People from Gloucestershire
British non-fiction writers
Cheltenham Ladies' College faculty